Charles Constantine Hodgins (September 16, 1857 – March 11, 1942) was a farmer and politician in Ontario, Canada. He represented Middlesex North in the Legislative Assembly of Ontario from 1905 to 1908 as a Conservative member.

Biography

The son of John Hodgins and Amelia Roberts, he was born in Biddulph township. After completing his education, Hodgins taught school for eight years, after which he settled on a farm. He served as reeve for the township from 1887 to 1897. His grandfather Colonel James Hodgins, a native of County Tipperary, Ireland, had served as the first reeve of Biddulph.

In 1884, he married Matilda Hodgins. In 1908 he was appointed bursar of Ontario Hospital in Woodstock and then transferred to a hospital in Kingston in 1914. He retired in 1927. He died in 1942 in Woodstock.

References

External links

1857 births
1942 deaths
Progressive Conservative Party of Ontario MPPs